The Piano is a televised British talent show competition, centred on piano performances. It is hosted by Claudia Winkleman with Lang Lang and Mika as judges. It is produced by Love Productions and aired on Channel 4 from 15 February to 15 March 2023.

Format 

Amateur musicians are invited to publicly perform on street pianos in the concourses of major UK railway stations. Performances cover a variety of genres, with some performers accompanying themselves with vocals. Performed pieces include classical standards, contemporary chart hits, and original compositions.

The competitive element is kept secret from the performers — the judges observe the performances from a nearby room, selecting one performer from each location to perform at an end-of-series concert at the Royal Festival Hall.

Episodes

Reception 
The Guardian awarded the first episode four stars our of five and asking if it could be considered "Bake Off for pianos". The Mirror considered the show to be "brilliantly simple" and life-affirming. In contrast, the i considered the show to be "aimless fluff".

References

External links 
 
 

2023 British television series debuts
2020s British reality television series
Channel 4 reality television shows
Piano competitions
Talent shows
English-language television shows